The Laverda 750SFC (Super Freni Competizione) is a hand-built  air cooled SOHC 4 stroke parallel twin production racing motorcycle produced by the Italian manufacturer Laverda from 1971-1976. It was developed from the company's 750SF and drew from the racers used at the 1970 Bol d'Or. Finished in orange with a distinctive half-fairing, the machine was made in batches, with each batch identified by the frame number range. In total 549 SFCs were manufactured.

History

Introduced in May 1971, the first 23 SFCs were manufactured for use by the factory racing team and had frame numbers in the 5,000 range. The engines were modified with higher compression, larger valves, gas-flowed and a new camshaft. A higher flow oil pump and improved bearings were used to improve reliability. Twin  Amal carburettors were fitted. The chassis was strengthened by using larger diameter tubes and suspension altered. An aluminium tank was fitted and fibreglass fairing and seat tail. They dominated the 1971 endurance racing season, including 6 wins.

1st batch
78-80 machines were made in November 1971 and were also available to the public. This is general considered the 'first batch' with 8,000 frame numbers. These had a modified swinging arms, longer exhausts with shorter silencers and a fibreglass tank. Compression ratio was increased to 9.6:1 by using Mondial pistons giving  @ 7,300 rpm. A close ratio gearbox was fitted and a Ceriani front brake was available as an option.

2nd batch
A second batch was produced in early 1972 with 11,000 frame numbers. These had a revised fairing, seat and exhaust.

Three SFCs were made in 1973 for development use. They were fitted with magnesium crankcases, new heads and lighter crankshafts. These changes made the engines fragile and the bikes difficult to ride so the new parts weren't used on subsequent machines.

3rd batch
In 1974, 222 SFCs were built, just under half of these being exported to the US as street legal production racers. The frame was lowered, bigger forks fitted and the bodywork revised. Twin  Brembo disc brakes were fitted on the front with a single disc on the rear. The engine was modified with a larger oil pump, lighter crankshaft and conrods, a higher 9.9:1 compression ratio and modified valves. The carbs were changed to  Dell'Ortos. A magnesium rear hub was fitted and the gearbox cover was also magnesium. This third batch had 16,000 frame numbers for the European machines and 17,000 for the US machines which were fitted with Nippon-Denso speedos, turn indicators and other items to comply with federal regulations.

4th batch
The 4th batch (18,000 frame numbers) was known as the 'Electronica' and was fitted with electronic ignition and an oil cooler. The engines were modified with 10.5:1 compression ratio, revised head and an optional higher-lift cam. The final 33 machines were fitted with cast wheels.

In 1985 the factory intended to produce 200 replicas of the 750SFC but these never went into production.

Palmelli
In 1997 the British company Palmelli began produce replica SFCs in small quantities. These were marketed by the former Laverda UK importers Slater Bros. They also produced an  cc version in 1998 with a 90° crank and a new frame with monoshock rear suspension.

Gallery

Technical details

Engine and transmission
The SOHC all-alloy twin engine was of unit construction with horizontally split crankcases which helped keeping the engine oil-tight. 4 main bearings supported the crankshaft and the big ends were double-row roller bearings. A duplex chain drove the camshaft and the electric starter used a single chain. A dynamo was mounted on the right end of the crank and the oil pump and points were on the left, which made a wide engine for a twin. Ignition was by points and coil with power supplied by a belt driven Bosch 150 watt dynamo.

A triplex chain took power to the 7 plate wet clutch. A 5 speed gearbox was fitted and final drive was by chain.

Cycle parts
A spine frame was used which didn't have downpipes but used the engine as a stressed member. Front suspension was by Ceriani telescopic forks and rear by swinging arm with twin Koni shock absorbers.

References

Bibliography

External links

 

750SFC
Motorcycles introduced in 1971
Racing motorcycles
Motorcycles powered by straight-twin engines